Jennifer Narvaez Austria-Barzaga (born September 22, 1975) is a Filipino politician who has been the Mayor of the City of Dasmariñas since 2019 and had previously held this position from 2007 until 2016.

Early life and education 
Barzaga born on September 22, 1975, to Nicanor Austria and Anician Narvaez. She educated elementary at the Dasmariñas Bagong Bayan Elementary School-C. She was placed Best in Math at the time. She later studied secondary at the Immaculate Conceptsion Academy, and tertiary and graduated at the De La Salle University-Dasmariñas. Barzaga became a staff nurse at the DLSU-UMC after her graduation.

Political career 
Barzaga became a barangay councilor of Barangay San Simon in 1997. In 2007, Barzaga became the mayor of Dasmariñas after she won in the 2007 elections. She campaigned successfully for the cityhood of the municipality in 2009, and was made its first city mayor. She was later elected in 2010 and 2013.

Barzaga ran as the member of the House of Representatives in 2016 elections, which she won. She won again as mayor in the 2019 election.

Personal life 
Barzaga married Elpidio Barzaga Jr., former mayor of Dasmariñas and current congressman. They have three children, including Francisco, ("Kiko"), an incumbent councilor of the same city.

On November 16, 2015, Barzaga played badminton and volleyball while she attended the city's employees' sportsfest.

References 

Mayors of places in Cavite
People from Dasmariñas
Women mayors of places in the Philippines
De La Salle University alumni
Living people
1975 births